WXRQ (1460 AM, "The Power Gospel") is a radio station broadcasting a Southern Gospel music format. Licensed to Mount Pleasant, Tennessee, United States, the station is currently owned by Greg Combs Providential Broadcasting, LLC, and features programming from GNC Radio Network.

References

External links

Southern Gospel radio stations in the United States
Maury County, Tennessee
Radio stations established in 1974
XRQ